Skjeggedal may refer to:

Places
Skjeggedal, Agder, a village area in Åmli municipality in Agder county, Norway
Skjeggedal, Vestland, a village in Ullensvang municipality in Vestland county, Norway